Pedro Verdugo y Ursúa, 2nd Count of Torrepalma (1657–1720) was a Spanish noble and academician.

Life and career
He was a knight of the Order of Alcantara since 1668, and on the death of his father Alonso Verdugo y Albornoz (1623–1680) he became the second count of Torrepalma. Between 1715 and 1720 he was a member of the Real Academia Española de la Lengua, the organization charged with setting standards for the Spanish language, which had been founded only three years prior in 1712 by King Philip V of Spain.

He was born in Carmona, in the province of Sevilla, and baptised in Seville on November 22, 1657. He was the father of Alonso Verdugo de Castilla (1706–1767), the third count of Torrepalma, who was also a member of the royal academy from 1740 to 1767.

1657 births
1720 deaths
Counts of Spain
Members of the Royal Spanish Academy
People from Campiña de Carmona